Garnett Municipal Airport  is a city-owned public-use airport located two nautical miles (4 km) east of the central business district of Garnett, a city in Anderson County, Kansas, United States.

Facilities and aircraft 
It has one asphalt paved runway designated 1/19 which measures 2,660 by 45 feet (811 x 14 m).

For the 12-month period ending July 24, 2008, the airport had 11,060 aircraft operations, an average of 30 per day: 99% general aviation and 1% military. At that time there were 10 aircraft based at this airport: 80% single-engine and 20% multi-engine.

References

External links 
 Aerial photo as of 16 October 1991 from USGS The National Map
 

Airports in Kansas
Buildings and structures in Anderson County, Kansas